"Pain 1993" is a song by Canadian rapper Drake from his commercial mixtape Dark Lane Demo Tapes (2020). It features guest vocals by American rapper Playboi Carti.

Background
In early April 2020, Drake teased a collaboration with Playboi Carti during an Instagram live session, sharing a snippet of the track and its title. The song is a tribute to fashion designer Ian Connor, who was the manager of Playboi Carti and had previously worked with hip hop artists ASAP Rocky and Kanye West. Connor himself first teased the track in June 2019. "Pain 1993" marks Drake and Carti's first collaboration.

Critical reception
HotNewHipHop noticed Drake "brings his usual effortless delivery," while Playboi Carti "introduces his baby-voiced madness to a wider array of hip-hop and pop fans." In Pitchfork, Matthew Strauss deemed it the "stand out track" on the mixtape, and noticed it "offers a beat that glimmers like sheet metal." Strauss stated Carti "hypes Drake for the new song's first half... Then, when it's [his] turn, he doesn't upstage Drake so much," concluding "Drake and Carti blend their styles while still bouncing off each other, creating a hybrid that's distinct but new."

Commercial performance
The song debuted at number 7 on the US Billboard Hot 100, becoming Drake's 38th Hot 100 top 10, matching Madonna for the most in the chart's history. For Playboi Carti, it became his first top 10 entry, besting the number 29 peak of 2017's "Magnolia".

Charts

References

External links

2020 songs
Drake (musician) songs
Playboi Carti songs
Songs written by Drake (musician)
Songs written by Playboi Carti
Songs written by Pi'erre Bourne